The 2017 Africa Cup of Nations was an international football tournament hosted by Gabon from 14 January to 5 February 2017.

Group A

Gabon
Coach:  José Antonio Camacho

The final squad was announced on 27 December 2016, with Axel Méyé, Johann Lengoualama and Donald Nzé being called as standby players.

Burkina Faso
Coach:  Paulo Duarte

A 24-man provisional squad was announced on 15 December 2016. Souleymane Koanda was added to the provisional squad on 21 December. The final squad was announced on 6 January 2017, with Ernest Congo and Issoumaila Lingane being left out of the team.

Cameroon
Coach:   Hugo Broos

A 35-man provisional squad was announced on 12 December 2016. On 20 December, it was announced that Guy N'dy Assembé, André Onana, Joël Matip, Allan Nyom, Maxime Poundjé, Ibrahim Amadou and André-Frank Zambo Anguissa decided to not take part in the competition. Eric Maxim Choupo-Moting also decided to withdraw from the tournament on 3 January 2017. The final squad was announced on 4 January 2017, with Anatole Abang, Henri Bedimo, Aurélien Chedjou and Franck Kom being left out of the team.

Guinea-Bissau
Coach: Baciro Candé

A 35-man provisional squad was announced on 18 December 2016. Eliseu Cassamá and Yazalde rejected the call. The final squad was announced on 4 January 2017, with Abudu, Guti Almada, Mama Samba Baldé, Edelino Ié, Edouard Mendy, Formose Mendy, Mesca, Pelé, Bruno Preira, Jean-Paul Mendy, Cícero Semedo and Zé Turbo being left out of the team. Though not part of the preliminary squad, Rui Dabó was added to the squad.

Group B

Algeria
Coach:  Georges Leekens

A 32-man provisional squad was announced on 22 December 2016. The final squad was announced on 31 December 2016, with Ayoub Azzi, Ishak Belfodil, Ismaël Bennacer, Yassine Benzia, Sofiane Feghouli, Houari Ferhani, Carl Medjani, Adam Ounas and Idriss Saadi being left out of the team. On January 11, 2017, Ismaël Bennacer was called up to replace Saphir Taïder, who suffered an injury in training.

Tunisia
Coach:  Henryk Kasperczak

A 41-man provisional squad was announced on 20 December 2016. The final squad was announced on 4 January 2017, with Ghazi Abderrazzak, Khaled Ayari, Änis Ben-Hatira, Issam Ben Khémis, Farouk Ben Mustapha, Saad Bguir, Nejmeddin Daghfous, Oussama Haddadi, Hamdi Harbaoui, Bilel Ifa, Issam Jebali, Ali Machani, Iheb Mbarki, Yassine Meriah, Idriss Mhirsi, Iheb Msakni, Abdelkader Oueslati and Yoann Touzghar being left out of the team.

Senegal
Coach: Aliou Cissé

The final squad was announced on 30 December 2016.

Zimbabwe
Coach: Callisto Pasuwa

A 31-man provisional squad was announced on 19 December 2016. The final squad was announced on 4 January 2017, with Nelson Chadya, Liberty Chakoroma, Talent Chawapiwa, Ronald Chitiyo, Tafadzwa Kutinyu, Blessing Moyo, Marshal Mudehwe and Tendai Ndlovu being left out of the team.

Group C

Ivory Coast
Coach:  Michel Dussuyer

A 24-man provisional squad was announced on 28 December 2016. The final squad was announced on 4 January 2017, with Ousmane Viera being left out of the team.

DR Congo
Coach: Florent Ibengé

A 31-man provisional squad was announced on 23 December 2016. Benik Afobe rejected the call. The final squad was announced on 6 January 2017, with Jonathan Bijimine, Junior Kabananga, Wilson Kamavuaka, Christian Luyindama, Elia Meschak, Vital N'Simba and Ricky Tulengi being left out of the team. Although he was initially announced as part of the final squad, Hervé Kage was later dropped from the team and replaced by Junior Kabananga.

Morocco
Coach:  Hervé Renard

A 26-man provisional squad was announced on 22 December 2016. Aziz Bouhaddouz was added to the squad on 2 January 2017 after the injuries of Younès Belhanda and Oussama Tannane. The final squad was announced on 4 January 2017, with Ismail Haddad and Mohamed Nahiri being left out of the team. On 5 January, it was announced that Omar El Kaddouri would join the team in fear of an injury of Nordin Amrabat (which was later confirmed) while Faycal Rherras was called to replace Sofiane Boufal on 13 January.

Togo
Coach:  Claude Le Roy

A 25-man provisional squad was announced on 21 December 2016. The final squad was announced on 4 January 2017, with Joseph Douhadji and Victor Nukafu being left out of the team.

Group D

Ghana
Coach:  Avram Grant

A 26-man provisional squad was announced on 2 January 2017. The final squad was announced on 4 January 2017, with Fatau Dauda replacing an injured Adam Kwarasey, while Raphael Dwamena, Joseph Larweh Attamah and Abdul Majeed Waris were being left out of the team.

Mali
Coach:  Alain Giresse

A 26-man provisional squad was announced on 30 December 2016. The final squad was announced on 4 January 2017, with Souleymane Diarra, Falaye Sacko and Adama Traoré being left out of the team.

Egypt
Coach:  Héctor Cúper

A 27-man provisional squad was announced on 29 December 2016. The final squad was announced on 4 January 2017, with Mohamed Awad, Ahmed Gomaa, Mohamed Ibrahim and Hamada Tolba being left out of the team.

Uganda
Coach:   Milutin Sredojević

A 26-man provisional squad was announced on 30 December 2016. The final squad was announced on 4 January 2017, with Edrisa Lubega, Muzamir Mutyaba & Benjamin Ochan being left out of the team.

Player representation

By club
Clubs with 3 or more players represented are listed.

By club nationality

By club federation

By representatives of domestic league

References

External links
 Official lists of players, CAFonline.com

2017
Squads